The Federation of Internet Solution Providers of the Americas (FISPA) is an association of Internet service providers.

FISPA was established in 1996 under the name Florida Internet Solution Providers Association. After expanding beyond the bounds of Florida, the organization was renamed the Federation of Internet Solution Providers of the Americas. FISPA is made up of members dedicated to facilitating smoother online and networked operations. It is based in Matthews, North Carolina, U.S.A.

References

External links
Federation of Internet Solution Providers of the Americas
 Federation of Internet Solution Providers of the Americas – Who We Are

1996 establishments in the United States
Trade associations based in the United States